Cystiscus angasi is a species of very small sea snail, a marine gastropod mollusk or micromollusk in the family Cystiscidae.

Description
The size of the shell attains 1.8 mm.

Distribution
This marine species was found off Port Jackson, Australia.

References

External links
 Crosse H. (1870). Diagnoses molluscorum novorum. Journal de Conchyliologie. 18: 301-304
  Coovert G.A. & Coovert H.K. (1995) Revision of the supraspecific classification of marginelliform gastropods. The Nautilus 109(2-3): 43-110

Cystiscidae
Gastropods described in 1870
Angasi